Halliwell is a surname. It may refer to:

People 
 Bryn Halliwell (born 1980), English football goalkeeper
 Danny Halliwell (born 1981), rugby league footballer who played in the 2000s and 2010s
 David Halliwell (1936–2006), British dramatist
 David Halliwell (cricketer) (born 1948), English former cricketer
 Edward Halliwell, 16th century playwright
 Ernest Halliwell (1864–1919), South African cricketer, son of Richard Halliwell
 Francis Halliwell, Archdeacon of Bombay from 1963 until 1965
 Geri Halliwell (born 1972), British singer
 Joe Halliwell (1892–1964), English footballer
 Joel Halliwell (1873–1956), British soldier, recipient of the Victoria Cross
 Kenneth Halliwell (1926–1967), British actor, writer and murderer
 Lauren Halliwell (born 1989), English ice hockey player
 Leslie Halliwell (1929–1989), British film critic, writer and chief buyer for the ITV network
 Richard Halliwell (disambiguation)
 Robert Halliwell (born 1948), Australian convicted drug trafficker
 Stephen Halliwell (classicist) (born 1953), British classicist and academic
 Steve Halliwell (born 1946), English actor
 Steve Halliwell (rugby league) (born 1962), English born Australian rugby league footballer
 Thomas Halliwell (1900–1982), Anglican cleric and Principal of Trinity College Carmarthen

Fictional characters

of Charmed 
 Melinda Halliwell
 Penelope Halliwell
 Patricia Halliwell
 Prue Halliwell
 Piper Halliwell
 Phoebe Halliwell
 Paige Matthews, often misidentified as Paige Halliwell
 Wyatt Halliwell
 Chris Halliwell

of other works 
 Alma Halliwell, in the UK soap opera Coronation Street

See also
 James Halliwell-Phillipps (1820–1889), British Shakespearean scholar
 Halliwells, an English law firm from 2004 to 2010
 Halliwell Manuscript, a Masonic manuscript/poem